Gryllus personatus, the badlands cricket, is a species of cricket in the subfamily Gryllinae. It is found in North America.

References

personatus
Articles created by Qbugbot
Insects described in 1864